Christopher Hall may refer to:

People 

  (born 1962), comedian and musician
 Christopher Newman Hall (1816–1902), English clergyman
 Christopher Hall (sculptor) (born 1942), British sculptor
 Christopher Hall (musician) (born 1965), American musician and vocalist
 Christopher Hall (producer) (born 1957), British TV drama producer
 Christopher Hall (theologian) (born 1950), American Episcopal theologian
 Christopher Hall (cricketer) (born 1977), former English cricketer
 Christopher Hall (Big Brother), British Big Brother contestant

Places 
 Christopher Hall Island, Nunavut, Canada

See also
Chris Hall (disambiguation)

Hall, Christopher